Blandford, officially known as Blandford Forum is a small historic market town in the English county of Dorset, United Kingdom. Blandford may also refer to:

Places called Blandford
 Blandford, Massachusetts, United States, a New England town
 Blandford (CDP), Massachusetts, the main village in the town
 Blandford, New South Wales, Australia
 Blandford, Ontario, Canada
 Blandford, Nova Scotia, Canada
 Blandford, Virginia (former town annexed by Petersburg, Virginia), United States
 Blandford (Mount Dora, Florida), a historic building
 Port Blandford, a town in eastern Newfoundland, Newfoundland and Labrador, Canada

Other places
 Blandford Camp, a military base lying 2 miles (3 km) north-east of Blandford Forum
 Blandford Cemetery, located in Petersburg, Virginia, USA. The oldest stone, marking the grave of Richard Yarbrough, reads 1702. Veterans of six wars are buried there
 Blandford Avenue, a road in Wolvercote near the Ring Road in Oxford

Titles
 Marquess of Blandford, a subsidiary title of the Duke of Marlborough

Other

 Battle of Blandford, at Blandford, Virginia, during the American Revolutionary War
 Blandford (surname)
 Blandford (horse), Irish Champion Thoroughbred sire
 Blandford (soil), a loam or sandy loam soil which has developed on glacial till in parts of southern Quebec and northern New England
 Blandford Stakes, a Group 2 flat horse race in Ireland which is open to thoroughbred fillies and mares aged three years or older

See also
 Blanford (disambiguation)